The Centripetal Spring Chair or Armchair was a 19th-century American office chair, and one of the first modern designs for office chairs.

Designed in 1849 by the American inventor Thomas E. Warren (b. 1808), the chair was produced by the American Chair Company in Troy, New York. Made of cast iron and varnished steel with wood and velvet upholstery, it measured 107 × 61 × 71 centimeters with headrest and armrests, and had a seat height of 48 centimeters. 

The chair exhibited all features of today's office chairs except adjustable lumbar support:  it allowed tilt movement in all directions and had a revolving seat, caster wheels for ease of movement, as well as a headrest and armrests in the armchair variant. Tilting was achieved through the flexion of the four large C-shaped steel springs on which the seat rested, using the sitter's feet as a fulcrum. The modernity of its design, which included an innovative use of cast iron for the frame, was visually downplayed by hiding the springs behind a dense passementerie (an elaborate trim) and by rendering the frame in the nostalgic, gilded Rococo Revival style. 

After it was first presented at the 1851 Great Exhibition in London, the chair had little success outside the USA: it was deemed immoral because it was too comfortable. The Victorian morality of the time valued rigid, unsupportive seats that allowed sitters to demonstrate refinement, willpower and morality through an upright posture.  Today, reflecting its place in the history of chair design, the chair is exhibited in design museums, including the Vitra Design Museum  and the Brooklyn Museum.

References

Bibliography

1849 works
Chairs
Individual models of furniture